William Fox (9 August 1912 – 6 March 1999) was an English freestyle sport wrestler who competed for Great Britain in the 1936 Summer Olympics. In 1936 he competed in the freestyle welterweight tournament. At the 1934 Empire Games he won the silver medal in the freestyle welterweight class.

References

External links
 

1912 births
1999 deaths
Olympic wrestlers of Great Britain
Wrestlers at the 1936 Summer Olympics
British male sport wrestlers
Wrestlers at the 1934 British Empire Games
Commonwealth Games silver medallists for England
Commonwealth Games medallists in wrestling
Medallists at the 1934 British Empire Games